The Bolsover School is a mixed secondary school located in Bolsover in the English county of Derbyshire.

The previous buildings were closed in July 2010 and later demolished, replaced by a new-build nearby on the former football pitch. Ex-pupil Steven Blakeley attended an open day on 17 July 2010, where former pupils and staff could meet.

The school was converted to academy status on 1 October 2012. It was previously a community school administered by Derbyshire County Council. The Bolsover School continues to coordinate with Derbyshire County Council for admissions.

The Bolsover School maintains a number of links with partner school abroad including Highland Park High School in Texas, United States, Kong Jiang Middle School in Shanghai, China,  Max-Planck-Gymnasium in Groß-Umstadt, Germany and Evangelisches Gymnasium in Berlin, Germany.

In 2014 the school joined a consortium with Heritage High School, Shirebrook Academy and Springwell Community College to form 'Aspire Sixth Form', a sixth form provision that operated across all the school sites. Aspire Sixth Form closed in 2016 due to low pupil numbers.

Notable former pupils
Steven Blakeley, actor
Ross McMillan, rugby union player

References

External links
The Bolsover School official website
Aspire Sixth Form official website

Secondary schools in Derbyshire
Academies in Derbyshire
Bolsover